The Northern Territory Civil and Administrative Tribunal (acronym NTCAT) is a tribunal in the Northern Territory. It was established by the Northern  Territory   Civil and Administrative Tribunal Act 2014.

References

External links
 Northern Territory Civil and Administrative Tribunal (NTCAT) official website

Northern Territory courts and tribunals
Australian tribunals
2014 establishments in Australia
Courts and tribunals established in 2014